The 2022 Copa do Nordeste was the 19th edition of the main football tournament featuring teams from the Brazilian Northeast Region. The competition featured 16 clubs, with Bahia, Ceará and Pernambuco having two seeds each, and Alagoas, Maranhão, Paraíba, Piauí, Rio Grande do Norte and Sergipe with one seed each. Four teams were decided by a qualifying tournament (Eliminatórias Copa do Nordeste 2022). The Copa do Nordeste began on 22 January and ended on 3 April 2022. Bahia were the defending champions, but were eliminated in the group stage.

Fortaleza defeated Sport 2–1 on aggregate in the finals to win their second title. As champions, Fortaleza would qualify for the third round of the 2023 Copa do Brasil, but they qualified for the Copa do Brasil as Série A 8th place. Therefore, the Copa do Nordeste berth was awarded to the runners-up Sport.

Format
In this season, 12 teams (9 state league champions and best placed teams in the 2021 CBF ranking from Ceará, Bahia and Pernambuco) gained direct entries into the group stage while the other four berths were decided by the Eliminatórias Copa do Nordeste.

For the group stage, the 16 teams were drawn into two groups. Each team played once against the eight clubs from the other group. Top four teams qualified for the final stages. Quarter-finals and semi-finals were played on a single-leg basis and finals were played on a home-and-away two-legged basis.

Qualification

The 2022 Copa do Nordeste qualification (officially the Eliminatórias Copa do Nordeste 2022) was the qualifying tournament of the 2022 Copa do Nordeste. It was played from 12 October to 18 November 2021. Twenty-four teams competed to decide four places in the Copa do Nordeste. The teams entered in three rounds where the four winners advanced to the Copa do Nordeste.

The winners were CRB (Alagoas), Floresta (Ceará), Sousa and Botafogo-PB (Paraíba).

Teams
The qualified teams were

Schedule
The schedule of the competition was as follows.

Draw
The draw for the group stage was held on 6 December 2021, 11:00, at the CBF headquarters in Rio de Janeiro. The 16 teams were drawn into two groups of eight containing two teams from each of the four pots with the restriction that teams from the same federation (except Floresta and Sousa) could not be drawn into the same group. Teams were seeded by their 2021 CBF ranking (shown in parentheses).

Group stage
For the group stage, the 16 teams were drawn into two groups of eight teams each. Each team played on a single round-robin tournament against the eight clubs from the other group. The top four teams of each group advanced to the quarter-finals of the knockout stages. The teams were ranked according to points (3 points for a win, 1 point for a draw, and 0 points for a loss). If tied on points, the following criteria would be used to determine the ranking: 1. Wins; 2. Goal difference; 3. Goals scored; 4. Fewest red cards; 5. Fewest yellow cards; 6. Draw in the headquarters of the Brazilian Football Confederation (Regulations Article 13).

Group A

Group B

Results

Final stages
Starting from the quarter-finals, the teams played a single-elimination tournament with the following rules:
Quarter-finals and semi-finals were played on a single-leg basis, with the higher-seeded team hosting the leg.
 If tied, the penalty shoot-out would be used to determine the winners (Regulations Article 17).
Finals were played on a home-and-away two-legged basis, with the higher-seeded team hosting the second leg.
 If tied on aggregate, the penalty shoot-out would be used to determine the winners (Regulations Article 17).
Extra time was not played and away goals rule was not used in final stages.

Starting from the semi-finals, the teams were seeded according to their performance in the tournament. The teams were ranked according to overall points. If tied on overall points, the following criteria would be used to determine the ranking: 1. Overall wins; 2. Overall goal difference; 3. Overall goals scored; 4. Fewest red cards in the tournament; 5. Fewest yellow cards in the tournament; 6. Draw in the headquarters of the Brazilian Football Confederation (Regulations Article 18).

Bracket

Quarter-finals

|}

Group C

Group D

Group E

Group F

Semi-finals

|}

Group G

Group H

Finals

|}

Group I

Top goalscorers

2022 Copa do Nordeste team
The 2022 Copa do Nordeste team was a squad consisting of the eleven most impressive players at the tournament.

||

References

2022 domestic association football cups
Copa do Nordeste
2022 in Brazilian football